Satoshi Matsui (12 March 1915 – 1 August 1995) was a Japanese basketball player. He competed in the men's tournament at the 1936 Summer Olympics. He later served as vice president of the Japan Basketball Association.

References

1915 births
1995 deaths
Japanese men's basketball players
Olympic basketball players of Japan
Basketball players at the 1936 Summer Olympics
Place of birth missing